The Imperial Typewriter Company was a British manufacturer of typewriters based in Leicester, England.

The company was founded by Hidalgo Moya, an American-Spanish engineer who lived in England. After first building the Moya typewriter, he set up the Imperial Typewriter Company in Leicester in 1911 with local businessmen John Gordon Chattaway, William Arthur Evans and Joseph Wallis Goddard. It stopped manufacturing typewriters when electric models and then word processors and personal computers became popular, causing typewriter sales to fall.

The company was acquired by Litton Industries in 1966, and gradually introduced Royal Typewriter Company models largely assembled from parts shipped from Hartford, Connecticut, United States. In May 1974, Asian workers at the Imperial Typewriter Company in Leicester went on strike over unequal bonus payments and discrimination in promotion. The shop stewards committee and Transport & General Workers Union branch refused their support, but the strikers stayed on strike for almost 14 weeks. The manufacture of typewriters ceased at Leicester and Hull in 1975.

Models

Imperial A
Imperial B
Imperial C
Imperial D
Imperial Doppelganger (see external link)
Imperial model 50
Imperial model 55
Imperial model 60
Imperial model 65
Imperial model 66
Imperial model 70
Imperial model 80 (Royal)
Imperial model 90
Imperial Electric
Imperial model 200
Imperial War Finish model
The Good Companion model 1
The Good Companion model 2
The Good Companion model 3
The Good Companion model 4
The Good Companion model 5
The Good Companion model 6/6T
Imperial Safari model
Imperial Messenger Portable Typewriter
Imperial Signet Portable Typewriter
Imperial Pavey Musigraph

References

External links
 https://web.archive.org/web/20091028060244/http://www.geocities.com/wbd641/EuropeImperial.html
 https://blog.sciencemuseum.org.uk/lily-paveys-musikriter/

Typewriters
Defunct manufacturing companies of the United Kingdom
Manufacturing companies based in Leicester